Clarence Williams may refer to:

Sports

American football
Clancy Williams (1942–1986), defensive back for Washington State University and Los Angeles Rams
Clarence Williams (defensive end) (1946–2017), for Prairie View A&M and Green Bay Packers
Clarence Williams (running back, born 1955) (1955–1994), football player for University of South Carolina, San Diego Chargers, Washington Redskins 
Clarence Williams (running back, born 1977), football player for University of Michigan and Arizona Cardinals
Clarence "Pooh Bear" Williams (1975–2022), running back for Florida State University and Buffalo Bills
Clarence Williams (tight end) (born 1969), for Washington State and Cleveland Browns; son of Clancy Williams

Other sports
Clarence Williams (baseball) (1866–1934), American baseball player

Others
Clarence Williams (musician) (1898–1965), American jazz pianist
Clarence Williams (photojournalist) (born 1967), American photojournalist 
Clarence Williams III (1939–2021), American actor
Clarence C. Williams (1869–1958), U.S. Army officer
Clarence Stewart Williams (1863–1951), U.S. Navy admiral